

Nimbus is a toolkit that, once installed on a cluster, provides an infrastructure as a service cloud to its client via WSRF-based or Amazon EC2 WSDL web service APIs. Nimbus is free and open-source software, subject to the requirements of the Apache License, version 2.

Nimbus supports both the hypervisors Xen and KVM and virtual machine schedulers Portable Batch System and Oracle Grid Engine. It allows deployment of self-configured virtual clusters via contextualization.  It is configurable with respect to scheduling, networking leases, and usage accounting.

Requirements
 Xen 3.x
 Kernel-based Virtual Machine
 Java 1.5+
 Python (2.4+)
 Linux kernel's Netfilter and ebtables for a bridging firewall
 DHCP server

See also

 Cloud computing comparison

References

External links 
 

Cloud infrastructure
Free software for cloud computing
Free software programmed in Java (programming language)
Free software programmed in Python
Virtualization software for Linux